Bidens laevis is a species of flowering plant in the daisy family known by the common names larger bur-marigold and smooth beggarticks. It is native to South America, Mexico, and the southern and eastern United States. It grows in wetlands, including estuaries and riverbanks.

Bidens laevis is similar in appearance to its relative Bidens cernua and the two are sometimes confused. This is an annual or perennial herb growing over 20 centimeters tall and sometimes much taller, exceeding one meter in height and sometimes approaching two. The narrow lance-shaped leaves are 5 to 15 centimeters long, with finely toothed edges and pointed tips. The inflorescence bears one or more flower heads which bend down as they become heavy with fruit after flowering. Each head has a center of yellow disc florets and a fringe of 7 or 8 yellow ray florets each up to 3 centimeters long. The fruit is a dry achene with sharp barbs that adhere to fur and clothing, thus helping the plant with seed dispersal.

References

External links
Jepson Manual Treatment
Calphotos Photo gallery, University of California
Go Botany, New England Wildflower Society, Bidens laevis (L.)
Atlas of Florida Vascular Plants
Santa Monica Mountains National Recreation Area photos, United States Department of the Interior, National Park Service
Illinois Wildflowers
El Estanque, fichas de plantas, Bidens laevis (Amor seco acuático) photo by Pablo J. Saubot

laevis
Flora of North America
Flora of South America
Plants described in 1753
Taxa named by Carl Linnaeus